Melomani (English: Music lovers), also known as Hot-Club Melomani, was a pioneer Polish jazz band, created by the first self-styled Polish jazz musicians.

It was founded in 1951 (or, according to other sources, in 1947) in Łódź, in the period of Stalinism, when jazz music was officially banned in Poland, as it was regarded synonymous with the reactionary American culture  and considered as part of Western, rotten imperialism.

Origins
Jazz music was played in the Second Polish Republic since late 1920s, mostly in fashionable restaurants and bars in major cities, such as Warsaw, Kraków or Poznań. Among most popular authors, played in Poland in the 1930s, were George Gershwin, Richard Rodgers and Lorenz Hart. However, there were no established, independent bands.

Following World War II, new, communist government of People's Republic of Poland banned jazz music, after the initial period of fascination and limited artistic freedom in 1946 and 1947. It was seen as part of the decadent, American culture and as such jazz was outlawed, together with modern art. This stance of the government was disliked among rebellious individuals and groups of the Polish youth (among them Leopold Tyrmand), who went underground to keep on playing their favorite music (hence, the period of late 1940s and early 1950s is called the catacombs).

Creation of the band
According to saxophonist and composer Jerzy Matuszkiewicz, who was the founding member of the band, Melomani consisted of students of the famous National Film School in Łódź, such as Witold Sobociński and Andrzej Wojciechowski (Matuszkiewicz also studied there) as well as other persons from Kraków and Poznań, because in Łódź itself, there were not enough jazz-oriented musicians. Later on, Krzysztof Komeda, generally regarded as the best jazz player in Poland, also joined the band. Other members were Witold Kujawski, Aleksander Tomys, Andrzej Kurylewicz and Andrzej Trzaskowski, but the lineup fluctuated.

Matuszkiewicz said in an interview given to Gazeta Wyborcza that even though playing jazz was illegal, officers of communist police, who controlled concerts, did not really know what jazz was. Usually, at the beginning of a concert, the officers were given a glass of vodka and did not care about the remaining part of the show. Given the circumstances (Polish musicians were separated from the West and Western jazz records were scarce), it is not surprising that the young enthusiasts were amateurs in comparison with American or even European musicians. The standard of performing jazz in Poland was low. However, this did not matter to the fans, as they embraced the band as the forbidden fruit. Melomani played the sort of music that they thought was jazz, such as Jelly Roll Morton and W.C. Handy.

Initially, Melomani played to a very limited audience, but starting since the mid-1950s, they expanded their base, and were invited to several festivals, such as legendary Jam Session 1, which took place in Sopot in 1955.

Aftermath
Melomani existed until early 1958 when, following the so-called thaw of some rules of the system (see: Polish October), jazz triumphantly returned to main venues of the country, and was played even in concert halls, which had been unheard of before. First concert of a Polish jazz band in a concert hall took place on January 5, 1958 in Warsaw and as one may expect, it featured Melomani
. Soon afterwards the band dissolved, because, as Matuszkiewicz said, it had fulfilled its task. Members of the ensemble created their own bands and Matuszkiewicz became a successful composer of soundtracks of several Polish movies.

See also
Music of Poland

References

1951 establishments in Poland
1958 disestablishments in Poland
Polish jazz ensembles
Musical groups established in 1951
Musical groups disestablished in 1958